Descent into Chaos is the second full-length studio album by the Greek/Swedish melodic death metal band Nightrage. It was released by Century Media Records on 21 February 2005 in Europe, on 5 April 2005 in the US and by King Japan on 27 April 2005 in Japan. It was Nightrage's last album to feature Gothenburg vocalist Tomas Lindberg.

Track listing

Personnel
 Tomas Lindberg − vocals
 Marios Iliopoulos − guitars
 Gus G. − guitars
 Henric Karlsson − bass
 Fotis Benardo − drums
 Mikael Stanne − additional vocals ("Frozen")

Additional personnel
 Fredrik Nordström – keyboards
 Patrik J. Sten - guitars ("Phantasma", "Frozen"), backing vocals, samples, intros, effects ("Being Nothing", "Descent into Chaos", "Reality Versus Truth", "Jubilant Cry")

Release history

References

Nightrage albums
Century Media Records albums
2005 albums